Carlo Boccarini (Rome, 2 June 1976) is an Italian former sprinter.

Biography
He was a meteor, in 1998, when was 22 years old, ran 100 metres with the 2nd all-time Italian best performance at that moment (after the national record of 10.01 by Pietro Mennea, later beaten by Filippo Tortu in 2018, with 10.03), with the time of 10.08. After he never repeated this time and prematurely retired from competitions.

In 1998 his performance on 100 metres was the 24th time in the world year top lists.

See also
Italian all-time lists - 100 metres

References

External links
 
 Carlo Boccarini at All-Athletics.com

1976 births
Italian male sprinters
Living people